Symphony No. 29 may refer to:

 Symphony No. 29 (Haydn)
 Symphony No. 29 (Michael Haydn)
 Symphony No. 29 (Mozart)

029